Banky or Bánky is both a given name and a surname. Notable people with the name include:

Vilma Bánky (1901–1991), Hungarian-born American silent film star
Viktor Bánky (1899–1967), Hungarian film editor and director

Fictional characters:
Banky Edwards, a fictional character in several movies by director Kevin Smith

See also
Banky Brook, a tributary of the River Trent in Staffordshire, England
Ernest Bankey (1920–2009), American World War II flying ace
Banki (disambiguation)

Masculine given names